"Serenade" is a song co-written and performed by Shades, issued as the second single from their eponymous debut album. The song contains a sample of "True" by Spandau Ballet; and it was the group's final song to chart on the Billboard Hot 100, peaking at #88 in 1997.

Music video

The official music video for the song was directed by Matt X.

Chart positions

References

External links
 
 

1996 songs
1997 singles
Motown singles
Shades (band) songs
Songs written by Gary Kemp
Songs written by Billy Lawrence
Songs written by Shannon Walker Williams
Songs written by Darrell "Delite" Allamby